Barbara Fish Lee (born July 3, 1945) is an American philanthropist.  She founded and leads the Barbara Lee Family Foundation and the Barbara Lee Political Office, both located in Cambridge, Massachusetts.  Major targets of Lee's donations include the Boston's Institute of Contemporary Art and Hillary Clinton's 2016 U.S. presidential campaign.  She is listed in Boston Magazine as one of “Boston’s Most Powerful Thought Leaders,” as well as one of “The 100 People Who Run This Town”. Boston Magazine also recognizes her as one of Boston's “50 Most Powerful Women”. Women's eNews ranks her among the “21 Leaders for the 21st Century". In 2015, Lee's contributions to various causes totaled upwards of $1.6 million. She is one of the top fifty national contributors to political campaigns and the third highest of all female contributors. She is best known for how nearly every person that she supports, be they political candidates or artists, identifies as a woman.

Early life 
Barbara Fish Lee was raised in a middle-class Jewish family in West Orange, New Jersey, the daughter of Sidney and Ruth Fish. Her father was a dentist and her mother a homemaker. In high school, she was a cheerleader and basketball player. Lee became a Girl Scout and ran for student government with the encouragement of her grandmother, a suffragist. Lee's grandmother also instilled her early interest in politics.

Education 
Lee graduated from the all-women Simmons College in 1967 with a bachelor's degree in Education and French Literature. She earned her master's degree in Social Work from Boston University. Lee also received an honorary degree in 2001 from Simmons College.

Simmons College presented Lee with a Lifetime Achievement Award at her 50th college reunion in 2017. At the ceremony, Lee said, “My experience at Simmons reshaped my view of the world. It showed me that women can be extraordinary leaders".

Career 
Barbara Lee was employed at a middle school teaching French soon after graduating from Simmons.

Treasurer Steven Grossman offered Lee her first board appointment for the Jewish Community Center of Greater Boston.  Grossman believed that Lee had "an enormous amount of talent, energy, and commitment to communal service" that "needed a little bit of water to reach full flower".

After Lee was appointed to Brandeis University's board of women's studies, Lee held several private events to determine what areas to invest in with her money. There, Lee became interested in “strategic philanthropy”, which is a form of philanthropy that uses money as a way to promote changes in society instead of spending it in excessive displays of consumerism. Lee said about the start of her philanthropic career, "I found myself in a position to empower women beyond my community. I decided to focus on women’s political leadership—and build a pipeline to the presidency".

Campaign support 
Lee chooses to support current and potential political candidates as well as artists who are women. While Lee receives some criticism for supporting only woman candidates, she insists that it is not a gender issue.  She has contributed upwards of $2.5 million to various campaigns.

At the suggestion of Laura Liswood in 1997, Lee decided to invest in grooming women political candidates for office. Lee co-founded the White House Project with Liswood and Marie Wilson in 1998. The White House Project aimed to put out magazine advertisements for women candidates, the likes of which included Hillary Clinton. The project hit roadblocks when 80% of the women running for gubernatorial positions that year lost their races.

This setback did not end Lee's support for women political candidates. Eventually, her efforts led to success. Another candidate that Lee supported in 2002, Jennifer Granholm, was elected as Governor of Michigan with 51% of the vote and Lee's support.

Lee also established the Barbara Lee Family Foundation. The Foundation published its findings on the lack of success for women gubernatorial candidates and ways they could improve their image on the campaign trail in Keys to the Governor’s Office: The Guide for Women Running for Governor.

Keys to the Governor's Office: The Guide for Women Running for Governor 
Keys to the Governor’s Office gives bipartisan assistance to women candidates and helps the women stay away from the “tough/soft dilemma”. The tough/soft dilemma refers to the Foundation's research on the way voters often view women candidates as too aggressive, too delicate, or both at the same time.

Art collection 
Barbara Lee's support for women working in male-dominated fields also bled over into Boston's modern art scene. Guerrilla Girls protests about the lack of women's art in art museums inspired Lee to specifically collect art created by women.  Barbara Lee is now one of the top 200 art collectors in the United States.

Sidney Fish, Lee's father, introduced Lee to modern art when she was 17 years old. Fish took his daughter to the anniversary exhibit of the 1913 Armory Show. Mildred Schiff Lee, Barbara Lee's mother-in-law, sold her the first piece of art for her original collection.

Lee recently donated 43 art pieces to the Institute of Contemporary Art in Boston. She also provided a $51-million new building for the ICA and donated Cornelia Parker's Hanging Fire (Suspected Arson), one of the museum's earliest pieces.

By 2011, Lee helped to bring the total percentage of women artists in the Boston Museum of Fine Arts to 11%.

Barbara Lee Family Foundation 
Barbara Lee founded the Barbara Lee Family Foundation in 1998. The Foundation's goal is to produce "nonpartisan, pragmatic research for women candidates”. The Foundation works as another way to promote gender equality in politics. The Foundation is currently led by Barbara Lee alongside the Executive Director, Amanda Hunter.

The Barbara Lee Family Foundation advocates for female presidential candidates and promotes the possibility of a successful female presidential candidate. The Foundation supports women in lower political positions as well as presidential candidates, such as women running for gubernatorial positions.  Lee's philosophy is that, "If we want to elect a woman president, one of the ways to do that is to elect more women governors".

"Women are more likely to be engaged in politics, to vote, and even consider running for office themselves when they see more women in public office," says Lee.

Lee personally identifies as a Democrat, but her foundation is bipartisan.

Personal life 
The then Barbara Fish married Thomas H. Lee in 1968. Lee was a private investor.  Thomas Lee began to gain wealth in 1974 when he created his own private equity investment firm. He bought and sold a series of companies, making him “the envy of Wall Street”.

The couple had two sons, Zach (born 1971) and Robbie Lee. Lee foreshadowed her own future activism when she gifted all the women at her son Zach's first birthday with copies of the first Ms. magazine, founded by Gloria Steinem and Dorothy Pitman Hughes.

Barbara Lee originally filed for divorce from her husband in 1987 but ended the petition two years later. Her husband had an affair in 1993 with a stockbroker who was later accused of extortion.  The Lees officially ended their marriage in 1995, leaving Barbara Fish Lee with half of their combined personal wealth. Her husband's value in late 1994 was over $420 million.

References

External links 
 

American women  philanthropists
Jewish American philanthropists
1945 births
Living people
21st-century American Jews
20th-century American Jews
Simmons University alumni
People from West Orange, New Jersey
Philanthropists from New Jersey
20th-century American philanthropists
21st-century American philanthropists